The Peter Gano House is a historic three-story house in Avalon, California. It was built in 1888-1890 by Peter Gano, a civil engineer, and designed in the Queen Anne style, with a cupola. It was purchased by Joshua Reed Giddings in 1921, followed by John Smith in 1961. It has been listed on the National Register of Historic Places since September 15, 1983.

References

National Register of Historic Places in Los Angeles County, California
Queen Anne architecture in California
Houses completed in 1890
1890 establishments in California